Penamecillin, an acetoxymethyl ester of benzylpenicillin, is a prodrug processed to benzylpenicillin by esterases.

References 

Penicillins